Ahmet Rıza Bey (1858 – 26 February 1930) was an Ottoman-born Turkish politician, educator, and a prominent member of the Young Turks, during the Second Constitutional Era of the Ottoman Empire. He was also a key early leader of the Committee of Union and Progress.

In 1908 he became the first President of the revived Chamber of Deputies, the lower house of the Ottoman Parliament, and in 1912, he was appointed as a Senator as well. He was the leading negotiator during the failed agreement of coalition between the Ottoman Empire, France, and Britain for World War I. During the war, he was one of the only CUP politicians who opposed and condemned the Armenian genocide while it was ongoing.

Ahmet Rıza has been described as a polymath by some authors.

Biography
Ahmet Rıza was born in Istanbul in 1858, the son of Ali Rıza Bey. His father was nicknamed İngiliz ("Englishman") because of his command of the English language and admiration of the British Empire. His mother, Fraulein Turban, was born in Munich but was of Hungarian origin. She moved to Vienna, where she met İngiliz, and converted to Islam to marry him, taking the name Naile Sabıka Hanım. He graduated from Galatasaray High School in Istanbul and subsequently studied agriculture in France. As a young man, he sought to improve the condition of the peasantry in the Empire. He was concerned with the conditions of the farmers and wanted to implement agricultural methods, supporting the ideas of the French sociologist, Auguste Comte.

In 1894, he published a series of publications on unification of Islamic and Ottoman traditions of consultation. In 1895, Meşveret, the journal that he published, became a locus of the exiled Young Turks movement. Even though he was a Turkish nationalist, Rıza was horrified by the Hamidian massacres, which he blamed on the sultan and condemned as contrary to "the traditions of Islamicism and the precepts of the Koran". Ahmet Rıza opposed the maverick Prince Sabahaddin's calls for revolution and European intervention in the empire at the 1902 Congress of Ottoman Opposition in Paris, as well as any autonomous status for the Armenian-populated eastern provinces. At the Second Congress of Ottoman Opposition in 1907, Ahmet Rıza at first reluctantly endorsed the use of violence to depose the sultan, but later reversed his position.

Going to Paris 
According to a customized book in 1889, on the pretext of participating in the exhibition organized for the centenary of the French Revolution, there was a customized letter, which indicated he escaped to Paris and did not return. He became an interpreter as he learned French. At the University of Paris, he continued his lectures on positivism, taught by mathematician Pierre Laffitte, as he was influenced by Laffitte's thoughts about Islam and Eastern civilization in particular. Laffitte believed that Islam was the most advanced religion, so it was easy for Muslims to pass through positivism. Ahmet Rıza became one of the most active members of the Société Positiviste (Positivist Society), and since 1905 he has appeared as a "representative of Muslim communities" in the Comité Positif Occidental, establishing the spread of positivist international platitudes.

During his first years in Paris, he attempted to respond to various newspapers and magazines, which were writing unfavourably about the Ottoman Empire. In 1891, he wrote a letter to the postal and telegraph chronicle in Istanbul as he did not obey the instructions of the center of Paris to return to his country due to his use of the expression "liberty" in a lecture on Ottoman women and stated that he did not belong to any secret cemetery. Ahmet Rıza sent his thoughts to Sultan Abdul Hamid II in 1893. He continued to send sheets upon the request of his encouraging response and continuation; he tried to convince him that the constitutional regime was not a bad thing. In the case of sending the sixth party, he began to write political writings in French, which was published by the former Syrian deputy Halil Ganem with whom he published a newspaper, Meşveret, in Paris.

Second Constitutional Era

Later career 

In 1915, Rıza was one of the only Ottoman politicians who condemned the Armenian genocide. About a law to confiscate Armenian property, he stated in parliament: "It is also not legal to classify the goods mentioned by the law as abandoned goods because the Armenian owners of these goods did not abandon them willingly, they were exiled, expelled forcefully." Noting that such confiscation was contrary to the Ottoman Constitution, he added: "Strong-arm me, expel me from my village, then sell my property: this is never lawful. No Ottoman conscience or law can ever accept this."

As an educator, he enacted the inauguration of the second high school for girls in Turkey, the Kandilli High School for Girls in 1916 in Istanbul (it was intended to be the first, but the outbreak of World War I delayed the execution of the project).

During the armistice period, Sultan Mehmed VI Vahdettin appointed Ahmed Rıza as president of the Ottoman Senate, during which he informed the American diplomats of the Ottoman government's opposition to a League of Nation's mandate. Grand vizier Damat Ferit Pasha eventually outmaneuvered him, taking away his position. He defected to Mustafa Kemal (Atatürk) Pasha's movement and went to Paris on 22 June 1919. He was instrumental in the negotiations between France and the Grand National Assembly government. He returned to Turkey in 1926.

After retiring from public life at the end of World War I, Ahmet Rıza wrote his memoirs. They were published more than 50 years after his death in 1988 under the title Meclis-i Mebusan ve Ayan Reisi Ahmet Rıza Bey’in Anıları ("The Memoirs of Ahmet Rıza, the President of the Chamber of Deputies and the Senate"). He died on 26 February 1930 in Istanbul.

He was awarded Order of Karađorđe's Star.

Works

Books 
 Layihalar, 1889
 Vazife ve Mesuliyet series (Padishahs and Shehzades, Soldier, Woman)
 Tolarance Muslumane (İslamiyet’te Serbesti-i Ayin), 1897
 Meşveret diaries, 1903-1908
 La Crise de I’Orient (Burhan-ı Şark), 1907
 Echos de Turquie (Türkiye Haberleri), 1920
 La Faillite Morale de la Politique Occidentale en Orient (Batının Doğu Politikasının Ahlaken İflası), 1922

Magazines 
 Revue Occidentale, 1896-1908
 Positivist Review, 1900-1908

See also
 Witnesses and testimonies of the Armenian genocide

References

Sources

 

1858 births
1930 deaths
Date of birth missing
Galatasaray High School alumni
Government ministers of the Ottoman Empire
20th-century journalists from the Ottoman Empire
19th-century journalists from the Ottoman Empire
Young Turks
Witnesses of the Armenian genocide
Academics from Istanbul
Turkish people of Hungarian descent
19th-century writers from the Ottoman Empire
20th-century writers from the Ottoman Empire
Committee of Union and Progress politicians
Members of the Senate of the Ottoman Empire